In Hebrew, verbs, which take the form of derived stems, are conjugated to reflect their tense and mood, as well as to agree with their subjects in gender, number, and person. Each verb has an inherent voice, though a verb in one voice typically has counterparts in other voices. This article deals mostly with Modern Hebrew, but to some extent, the information shown here applies to Biblical Hebrew as well.

Verb classification

Roots 
Verbs in Hebrew, like nouns, adjectives, and adverbs, are formed and declined by altering a (usually) three letter stem. Vowels are added between or before these three consonants in a pattern to form a related meaning between different roots. A similar formation can be found in English strong verbs with write-wrote-written and drive-drove-driven sharing root consonants despite differing vowels and meanings.

Hebrew verbs are further divided into strong roots (regular verbs, with occasional and predictable consonant irregularities), weak roots (predictable verbs irregular by vowel), and wholly irregular verbs.

A root that changes the vowel used in a given pattern is considered a weak stem. These are further divided into guttural (containing alef, hey, het, ayin anywhere, or resh as the second root), hollow (containing vav or yud anywhere, or hey as the final root), and repeating roots (beginning with nun or ending with two of the same consonant); based on exact irregularities. Weak verbs are detailed further below:

Guttural weak roots 
Guttural roots contain a guttural consonant (such as alef (א), hey (ח), het (ח), or ayin (ע) in any position; or resh (ר) as the second letter). Hey (ה) as the third root is usually a hollow root marker due to being a vowel spelling rather than one of any consonant, and is only considered a guttural root in the third position if historically pronounced. Alef (א) root-initially and root-finally takes on a somewhat divergent conjugation similar to that of hollow roots, but is usually identical to other gutturals. Of the three classes of weak roots, guttural roots are the most common.

Vowel weak roots 
Roots containing a vav (ו) or yud (י) anywhere mark a historical vowel. Hey (ה) word-finally usually marks a final vowel for the same reason, and shares similar irregularities.

Repeating weak roots 
Roots containing two of the same letter or a nun (נ) in first position are considered repeating roots. Nun (נ) before a consonant doubles it or prevents beyt (בּ), kaf (כּ), and pey (פּ) from becoming veyt, khaf, and fey in word-medial position. Doubling consonants also changes the quality of the preceding vowel. However, doubling a consonant that doesn't change it outright (gemination) is obsolete in Modern Hebrew, and the irregularities usually affect the vowels.

Stems
Hebrew verbs are inflected according to specific patterns, derived stems, called forms or בִּנְיָנִים ( binyanim, "constructions"); where vowels patterns (משקלים /miʃkaˈlim/ mishkalim, "weights"), prefixes, and suffixes are put into the (usually) three-letter roots from which the vast majority of Hebrew words are made.

There are seven basic conjugations, as well as some irregular verbs coming from otherwise-obsolete constructions.

This chart's menorah-like shape is sometimes invoked in teaching the binyanim to help students remember the main ideas about the verb forms: (1) which binyanim are active voice (left side) vs. passive voice (right side), and (2) which binyanim are simple (outer-most menorah branches), intensive (second-outer-most), causative (third-outer-most), and reflexive (center). Note that some binyanim have more meanings than the ones shown here, as well as obsolete and rare ones being left off entirely.

In Early Modern Hebrew, the verb paradigm nitpa'el was much more common than hitpa'el, but it was ultimately marginalized because its meanings were a subset of hitpael. Shira Wigderson has postulated that the early popularity of nitpael was due to the influence of Yiddish; as the influence of Yiddish waned over time, the popularity of nitpael declined.

Regular conjugation

Present tense 
A verb in the present tense (הוֹוֶה  hove) agrees with its subject in gender (masculine or feminine) and number (singular or plural), so each verb has four present-tense forms.

The present tense does not inflect by person because its use as a present tense is a relatively recent trend, as this form was originally used only as the present participle alone; rather than both the present tense verb and present participle.

Earlier forms of the Hebrew language did not have strictly defined past, present, or future tenses, but merely perfective and imperfective aspects, with past, present, or future connotation depending on context. Later the perfective and imperfective aspects were explicitly refashioned as the past and future tenses, respectively; with the present participle also becoming the present tense. This also happened to the Aramaic language around the same time, and later in some varieties of Arabic (such as Egyptian Arabic).

Past tense 
A verb in the past tense (  'avar) agrees with its subject in person (first, second, or third), number, and in the second-person and third-person singular, gender. The corresponding subject pronouns are not necessarily used in conjunction.

Conjugation in the past tense is done by adding a suffix (universal among binyanim), to a binyan-specific root, so that <שמר> "guarded" adds <תי-> "I" to become <שמרתי> "I guarded". The root changes whether the suffix begins with a vowel or consonant. The third person masculine singular pronoun (he/ it) does not take a suffix and uses the plain stem; this is also the dictionary form for any given verb. There also used to be past-tense object suffixes, which came after the subject suffix, but these are obsolete.

Past participle 
Present participles are the same as present tense forms, as the Modern Hebrew present tense comes from a present participle form. Not all past participles shown here correspond to an existent adjective or one congruent to the verb's meaning; the ones shown here are just examples.

Past participles are formed according to the tables shown below. The past participle is also commonly used as an adjective (similar to English), and is inflected for number and gender. The passive and reflexive binyans hitpa'el, nif'al, pu'al, and huf'al lack passive participles.
Pa'al verbs that have a nif'al form corresponding to its passive voice use the pa'al participle and nif'al present to indicate different states of completion.

The pa'al past participle indicates an action is completely done:

  ("the books are written")

The nif'al present tense indicates that the action is still being done:

  ("the books are being written")

As shown below, pi'el and hif'il past participles use the present tense of the passive forms pu'al and huf'al, respectively.

Future tense 
A verb in the future tense (  'atid) inflects for person, number, and gender; which is expressed by adding prefixes to stems shown below. The second-person singular masculine and third-person singular feminine forms are identical for all verbs in the future tense. Historically, there have been separate feminine forms for the second and third person plural (shown in italics on the table). These are still occasionally used today (most often in formal settings); however, in everyday speech, most use the historically masculine plural for both genders. 

As in the past tense, personal pronouns are not strictly necessary in the future tense, as the verb forms are sufficient to identify the subject, but they are frequently used.

Imperative
All imperatives are only used in affirmative commands, and in predominantly formal contexts. Negative commands use the particle   followed by the corresponding future-tense form; as לא and a future tense negates the declaration not the command (contrast "don't do it" with "[you] won't do it"). The passive binyanim pu'al and huf'al do not have imperatives.

In informal speech, the future tense (shown above) is commonly used for affirmative commands, to avoid the implication of being demanding. So, for example,   can mean either "you will open" or "would you open" (masculine, singular). In Hebrew, as in English, the more formal way to avoid the implication of commanding is to use the word "please" (  or   ) with the imperative. 

The infinitive can also be used as a "general imperative" when addressing nobody in particular (i.e., on signs, or when giving general instructions, to children, or large groups); so ""  means "please do not open".

There also once were cohortative forms for the first person, and jussive forms for the imperative third person, but this is now obsolete.

Infinitive
In Modern Hebrew a verb has two infinitives: the infinitive construct (שם הפועל shem hapoal or מקור נסמך) and the rarely used infinitive absolute (מקור מוחלט). The infinitive construct is generally preceded by a preposition (e.g., -ב, -כ, -ל, -מ, עַד), usually the inseparable preposition -ל, meaning "to, for", although it can be used without a preposition. This article covers only infinitive construct with the preposition -ל. The passive binyans pu'al and huf'al do not have infinitives.

Action noun
Action nouns or gerunds (שמות פעולה shmot pe'ula) are nouns derived from a verb's action and so they inflect for number. In Hebrew, gerunds are formed using a specific pattern shown in the table below. Hebrew gerunds cannot be used as adjectives, unlike in English. The passive binyans pu'al and huf'al lack gerunds.

Not all gerunds shown here correspond to an attested noun or a noun with a meaning congruent to that of the verb.

Auxiliary verbs 
Auxiliary verbs are less common in Hebrew than in other languages. Some common   (helping verbs) are היה  , הלך  , יָכֹל  , עמד  '.

In Modern Hebrew the auxiliary היה haya is used for both an analytic conditional/ past-habitual mood and for a simple past-habitual aspect. In either case, היה is conjugated in the past tense and placed before present tense conjugations of the affected verb.

הלך and עמד are used to express an imminent future action. They may be conjugated either in the past or present tense, and are followed by the infinitive construct of the affected verb, prefixed by the inseparable preposition -ל.

Modal auxiliaries 
Modal auxiliaries are often adjectives, adverbs or modal verbs (often defective ones) conjugated in the present tense, and followed by the infinitive construct of the affected verb, prefixed by the inseparable preposition -ל. They may be used in conjunction with the auxiliary היה. Examples include  ulay,  asur,  chayav,  mutar, and  mukhrach.

יָכֹל yakhol is used to express a possible action. It may be conjugated in past, present or future tense and is followed by the infinitive construct of the affected verb, prefixed by the inseparable preposition -ל.

  is used to express a plausible or planned action.

Example:   ("He's unlikely to be hungry")

Irregular verbs

אמר/ הגיד Amar/ Higid (to say, tell) 
The verb אמר/ אָמַר is often replaced with forms of הגיד/ הִגִּיד  in common speech in the future, imperative, and infinitive. Likewise, the verb הגיד/ הִגִּיד is replaced with forms of אמר /אָמַר amar in the past and present. However, in formal speech, regular forms for each verb are still used, which are displayed in italics when in uncommon tenses.

בא Ba (to come) 
Irregular pa'al verb with regards to final alef א not causing vowel changes to the stem.

גדל Gadel (to grow) 
Pa'al verb irregular in the present, action noun, and to a lesser extent in the imperative and future.

הלך Halakh (to go, to walk) 
Pa'al verb irregular in the prefixed infinitive, future tense, and imperative mood.

היה Haya (to be) 

The verb  is often replaced by the adjective  or the verb  in the present tense.

It is regular in most forms except the present (which is rarely used) and imperative. In addition, the future third person singular has two other irregular forms.

יכול Yakhol (can, to be able to) 
Entirely irregular verb with no imperative form. The past tense masculine singular often adds היה haya for disambiguation.

ישן Yashen (to sleep) 
Pa'al verb irregular in the present tense and action noun.

לקח Lakach (to take) 
Functions as an initial-n pa'al verb, and has a shortened imperative.

מת Met (to die) 
Mainly irregular in the present tense and impersonal forms, and has two different action nouns.

ניגש Nigash (to approach, get to) 
Nif'al verb that takes forms from obsolete pa'al נגש nagash in the future, imperative, and infinitive.

נשא Nasa' (to carry, bear) 
Pa'al verb mainly irregular in the prefixed infinitive and imperative.

נתן Natan (to give, to let) 
Pa'al verb mainly irregular in the prefixed infinitive and imperative.

פחד/ פיחד Pachad/ Piched (to fear, be afraid of) 
The synonymous פיחד  is used elsewhere. פחד Pachad is a regular  verb on the whole, and פיחד  is a regular  verb.

קטון Katon (to dwindle) 
Functions like a regular pa'al verb in the past tense and infinitive, and to a lesser extent the future and imperative.

See also
 Hebrew grammar
 Prefixes and suffixes in Hebrew
 Waw-consecutive

References

Bibliography
 Academy Decisions: Grammar, chapter 3, for the Academy of the Hebrew Language's decisions on the conjugations of less common verb patterns
  ff.

External links
 Hebrew Verbs Conjugation Tool - Online Hebrew Verb Learning Tool (Hebrew/English)
 hspell - המאיית העברי החופשי - טופס הטיית פעלים  - Online Hebrew verb conjugator, based on hspell, the Free Hebrew spelling engine (in Ktiv male)
 Hebrew Verb Tables

Hebrew grammar
Afroasiatic verbs